The Broken Pledge is a 1915 American silent comedy film starring Wallace Beery and Gloria Swanson. Off screen, Beery and Swanson were briefly married.

Cast
 Wallace Beery as Percy 
 Virginia Bowker as Virginia
 Harry Dunkinson as Harold
 Gloria Swanson (billed as Gloria Mae Swanson)

References

External links

1915 films
American silent short films
American black-and-white films
1915 comedy films
1915 short films
Essanay Studios films
Silent American comedy films
American comedy short films
1910s American films